The 1965 Bowling Green Falcons football team was an American football team that represented Bowling Green State University in the Mid-American Conference (MAC) during the 1965 NCAA University Division football season. In their first season under head coach Bob Gibson, the Falcons compiled a 7–2 record (5–1 against MAC opponents), tied with Miami for the MAC championship, and outscored opponents by a combined total of 123 to 107.

The team's statistical leaders included Dwight Wallace with 425 passing yards, Stew Williams with 616 rushing yards, and Dave Cranmer with 180 receiving yards.

Schedule

References

Bowling Green
Bowling Green Falcons football seasons
Mid-American Conference football champion seasons
Bowling Green Falcons football